"Turn It Up" is a song by American recording artist Paris Hilton from her self-titled debut studio album Paris (2006). The song was written by Jeff Bowden, Dorian Hardnett and Scott Storch. It reached number one on the Billboard Hot Dance Club Play chart.

Track listing
Digital download
"Turn It Up" — 3:14

Digital download (U.S. Maxi Single)
"Turn It Up" (Paul Oakenfold Remix Edit) — 4:59
"Turn It Up" (DJ Dan's Hot 2 Trot Edit) — 4:48
"Turn It Up" (DJ Dan's Hot 2 Trot Dub Edit) — 4:47
"Turn It Up" (Peter Rauhofer Does Paris Edit) — 4:57
"Turn It Up" (Peter Rauhofer Turns It Up Edit) — 4:58

CD single
"Turn It Up" (Album Version) — 3:11
"Turn It Up" (DJ Dan's Hot 2 Trot Edit) — 3:48
"Turn It Up" (Paul Oakenfold Remix) — 5:44
"Turn It Up" (DJ Dan's Hot 2 Trot Dub) — 8:04
"Turn It Up" (DJ Dan's Hot 2 Trot Vocal) — 6:35
"Turn It Up" (Peter Rauhofer Does Paris) — 8:13
"Turn It Up" (Peter Rauhofer Turns It Up Mix) — 9:22

12" vinyl
"Turn It Up" (Album Version) — 3:11
"Turn It Up" (DJ Dan's Hot 2 Trot Vocal) — 6:35
"Turn It Up" (Paul Oakenfold Remix) — 5:44
"Turn It Up" (DJ Dan's Hot 2 Trot Dub) — 8:04
"Turn It Up" (Peter Rauhofer Turns It Up Mix) — 9:35
"Turn It Up" (Peter Rauhofer Does Paris) — 8:13
"Turn It Up" (Peter Rauhofer Remix Edit) — 4:55

Charts

Release history

See also
 List of number-one dance singles of 2006 (U.S.)

References

External links
 "Turn It Up" AOL World Premiere

2006 singles
Paris Hilton songs
Song recordings produced by Scott Storch
Songs written by Scott Storch
American contemporary R&B songs
Songs written by Paris Hilton